Wunnumin Lake Airport  is located  south of the First Nations community of Wunnumin Lake First Nation, Ontario, Canada.

Accidents and incidents
11 April 1977, Douglas C-47B C-FXXT of Superior Airways was damaged beyond economic repair in an aborted take-off.

References

External links

Certified airports in Kenora District